Sir George Seymour was built in Sunderland, Tyne and Wear in 1844 by Somes Brothers. She made one voyage transporting convicts to Australia and at least one carrying emigrants to Australia and one to New Zealand. A fire at sea in her cargo in December 1867 forced her crew to abandon her.

Convict transport
On 4 November 1844 Sir George Seymour, John Young Clarke, master, set sail from England, bound for Van Diemen's Land, Australia; she arrived at Hobart on 27 February 1845. She had embarked 345 male convicts and she landed 175 at Port Phillip and 169 at Hobart; one convict died on the voyage. She sailed for Calcutta on 27 June with 132 horses, and other cargo and passengers.

1849 emigrant voyage to Australia
Sir George Seymour sailed from Plymouth on 9 January 1849, bound for Geelong, Victoria. She was carrying 302 assisted immigrants and assorted cargo. (Ten vessels, carrying over 1000 immigrants to Australia, left that week.) She anchored off Port Henry on 14 May; she arrived at Melbourne 1 June. On 3 July she sailed from Sydney, bound for Singapore and Calcutta.

1850 emigrant voyage to New Zealand
In 1850 Sir George Seymour was one of the First Four Ships to carry emigrants from England to the new colony of Canterbury in New Zealand on behalf of the Canterbury Association. The other three ships were Cressy, Charlotte Jane, and Randolph.

Sir George Seymour left Plymouth Sound, England around 11am on Sunday, 8 September 1850, with about 227 passengers.
On 4 October, she sighed Randolph and a Mr. Davy, who had missed that ship at Plymouth, took the opportunity to change vessels and complete the voyage in his assigned ship and cabin, and be reunited with his outfit. One of Randolph's boats executed the passenger exchange and some of that ship's passengers took the opportunity to visit. The two ships sailed in company until 10 October. The ship sailed southward til, on 7 December, nearly 49° S. Then about 4 AM on Wednesday, 11 December, she sighted Stewart's Island, apparently earlier than either the Charlotte Jane or the Randolph did on that same day. However, she sailed closer to the cost of the South Island than her sister ships and dropped anchor in Port Victoria (off Lyttelton) at 10am on Tuesday, 17 December 1850, a day later than Charlotte Jane. Her passage was 100 days and 2 young children died during the journey.

The passengers aboard the first four ships were referred to as "The Pilgrims". Their names are inscribed on marble plaques in Cathedral Square in the centre of Christchurch.

The ship is remembered in the name of a road, George Seymour Quay, in the port town of Lyttelton.

Notable passengers
 John Anderson (1820–1897), second mayor of Christchurch
 John Anderson (1850–1934), his son
 Guise Brittan (1807–1876),  first Commissioner of Crown Lands for Canterbury
Emily Foster (1842–1897), teacher and school principal; daughter of Guise Brittan
 Richard James Strachan Harman (1826–1902), politician and businessman
 Henry Jacobs (1824–1901), first Dean of Christchurch
 Elizabeth Watts-Russell (1833–1905), community leader and wife of John Watts-Russell
 John Watts-Russell (1825–1875), politician and runholder

Later career and fate
In 1865 Sir George Seymour underwent repairs for damages. At the time her master was M'Ewen, her owner Higgins & Co., her homeport London, and her trade "Brs".

A fire destroyed Sir George Seymour in 1867. Her crew abandoned her. Leda, which was on her way to Calcutta, rescued 15 crew members.

Her entry in Lloyd's Register for 1867 carried the annotation "[B]URNT". The listing gave her master as M'Ewen, but her homeport now was Glasgow, and her owner D. Law.

Notes

Citations

References
 

History of Christchurch
Age of Sail merchant ships of England
Victorian-era passenger ships of the United Kingdom
Canterbury Association
Convict ships to Tasmania
Ships built on the River Tyne
Convict ships to Victoria
1844 ships
Maritime incidents in December 1867
1850s in Christchurch
Migrant ships to Australia
Migrant ships to New Zealand